Pegoscapus bacataensis is a species of fig wasp in the genus Pegoscapus which is native to Colombia. It has an obligate mutualism with Ficus andicola, the fig species it pollinates. It was first described by Sergio Jansen and Carlos Sarmiento in 2008. The egg stage of Pegoscapus bacataensis is around 130 days, longer than other pollinating fig wasps.

Etymology 
Pegoscapus bacataensis is named after Bacatá, the name for the Bogotá savanna in Muysccubun, the language of the indigenous Muisca.

See also 

List of flora and fauna named after the Muisca

References

Bibliography

External links 

Agaonidae
Arthropods of Colombia
Altiplano Cundiboyacense
Bacata
Hymenoptera of South America
Insects described in 2008